Donogh Dáll Ó Derrig, aka Blind Donogh O'Derrick, was an Irish rapparee, executed December 1656.

Ó Derrig was a rapparee active in County Kildare in the early 1650s in the aftermath of the Irish Confederate Wars.

A court-martial held at Kilkenny on 23 September 1653 found Murtagh Cullen and his wife guilty of sheltering Ó Derrig. Sentenced to death, they were allowed to draw lots to decide which of them would die. Upon Mrs. Cullen drawing the lot of death, the sentence was deferred on account of her pregnancy.

In July 1654 he led his band of outlaws and killed an Irishman working as a constable for the English, at Timolin in County Kildare.

In March 1655 he captured and afterwards hung eight surveyors  of Sir William Petty as accessories to a gigantic scheme of ruthless robbery. A price of £30 was put on his head and that of his lieutenant, Dermot Ryan. In the autumn, Ó Derrig's wife was one of thirty-seven people rounded up and transported via a frigate of Wexford to Barbados. They arrived there in May 1656. By then, Ó Derrig had been captured at a house in Timolin, summarily tried and executed. Dermot Ryan escaped and survived for another two years.

References

 Hell or Connaught! The Cromwellian Colonisation of Ireland 1652-1660, Peter Berresford Ellis, pp. 52–53, 112, 156, 161.

External links
 http://www.libraryireland.com/biography/SirWilliamPetty.php
 http://www.irishtimes.com/ancestor/surname/index.cfm?fuseaction=Go.&UserID=

People from County Kildare
Irish highwaymen
17th-century Irish people
People of the Irish Confederate Wars